Natalie Grinczer (born 15 November 1993) is a British professional racing cyclist, who currently rides for UCI Women's Continental Team .

References

External links
 

1993 births
Living people
British female cyclists
Place of birth missing (living people)
21st-century British women